Music Hop was a Canadian music television series that aired on CBC Television from 1963 to 1967.

Premise
Pop and rock music was featured in this series for youth, essentially a Canadian version of American Bandstand.

Production
The first season (1963–1964) was a Toronto production with host Alex Trebek who welcomed visiting musicians and introduced songs from the house musicians before a studio audience of dancing teenagers. He was replaced in following seasons by Dave Mickie, a disc jockey for CKEY in that time. Series musicians were Norm Amadio and the Rhythm Rockers, joined by The Girlfriends who were a female vocal trio. The producer of this season was Stan Jacobson.

The second season's schedule expanded to all weekdays with other Canadian cities contributing to the production of Music Hop:

 Mondays: Let's Go originated from Vancouver with producer Ain Soodor
 Tuesdays: Jeunesse Oblige originated from Montreal with producer Pierre Desjardins
 Wednesdays: Hootenanny originated from Winnipeg with host Ray St. Germain (Canadian Country Music Hall of Fame Inductee) with producer Ray McConnell
 Thursdays: Music Hop originated from Toronto with producer Allan Angus
 Fridays: Frank's Bandstand originated from Halifax with producer Manny Pitson

Scheduling
The first season of this half-hour series was broadcast Thursdays at 5:30 p.m. (Eastern) from its debut 3 October 1963. In the following two seasons, it was seen every weekday, also at 5:30 p.m., since 28 September 1964. In its final season, the Friday episode was omitted from 3 October 1966 until its final broadcast on 28 June 1967.

Reception
Music Hop attracted approximately one million weekly viewers according to CBC estimates, mostly under age 20, with an estimated one-third of those viewers adults.

See also
 Let's Go
 Where It's At (TV series)
 One More Time (Canadian TV series)

References

External links
 
 

CBC Television original programming
1963 Canadian television series debuts
1967 Canadian television series endings
Black-and-white Canadian television shows
Television shows filmed in Toronto
1960s Canadian music television series